Chico the Rainmaker is a British film serial made by Eyeline Films and the Children's Film Foundation.
It was shown in 1974 on PBS in the USA, and shown in British cinemas in the 1970s and 1980s as part of their "Saturday Matinees".
The series featured a talking shrunken head. It was also shown on television in the Maritimes as a 7-part serial in the mid-1970s on Saturday afternoons.

It was also known as The Boy with Two Heads.

Plot synopsis 

A boy named Chris Page finds a decorated box at a local antiques shop that contains an eerie shrunken head. He and his sister Jill, inadvertently play a special series of notes on a flute and call the head magically to life. It reveals itself to be Chicopacobacowana, a 2000 yr-old tribal witch doctor from the jungles of the Amazon. He is vital to the tribe both as protector and because he is their rainmaker. He has been making the rains for 2000 years however for the past three years, his people have been suffering from a drought.  

'Chico' had been taken from the jungle by explorers three years previously, and had been awaiting an opportunity to return to his tribe ever since. The shrunken head along with some other artifacts had been inadvertently sold as part of a lot to a local antiques shop owner who just wanted to buy an old lawnmower.  The shrunken head is being sought by an art dealer (Stanley Thornton) who knows it to be priceless.

Two thieves (Doug and Des) who had earlier attempted to burgle the antique shop, learn of a cash reward that Thornton is offering for Chico, and they attempt to capture him. The series centres on the children's adventures as they try to help Chico get home to South America while evading Thornton and the thieves.

Episodes 
It was "A Serial in Seven Episodes" with each episode approximately 15 minutes in length.
 1. The Mysterious Box
 2. Chico makes magic
 3. Chase for Chico
 4. The Magic Football
 5. The Secret Cave
 6. Chico makes the Rain
 7. Farewell to Chico

Cast & Characters 

Main characters:
 Spencer Plumridge as Chris Page
 Leslie Ash as Jill Page
 Hilda Fenemore as Hilda Page
 Peter Halliday as Mr. Page
 Stanley Meadows as Douglas
 Lance Percival as Stanley Thornton
 Louis Mansi as Desmond
 Clive Revill as Chico (voice)
 Alex Mackenzie as the All-Father (hair)

Director: Jonathan Ingrams

Theme song 

At the end of each episode, the words to the them song would be shown so you could sing along.Chico Chico the rainmaker, 

Chico Chico the rainmaker, Chico Chico the rainmaker, 

Chico Paco Baca Wana make the rain!

Chico I'm such a little fella, 

When I'm around you better get your umbrella, 

As I start to sway and my eyes go flash, 

The heavens open wide with a mighty crash!

External links

 DevilDead.com French entry 
 Video Clip of the Opening Credits and theme music on YouTube 
 Listing at the Children's Film and Television Foundation 

British children's films
1970s children's films
1970s British films

1970s British children's television series